Qarah Quch (also Romanized as Qarah Qūch; also known as Ḩojjatābād) is a village in Ojarud-e Gharbi Rural District, in the Central District of Germi County, Ardabil Province, Iran. At the 2006 census, its population was 216, in 43 families.

References 

Towns and villages in Germi County